Dunnerdale Fells is an upland area in the English Lake District, between Ulpha and Broughton Mills, Cumbria. It is the subject of a chapter of Wainwright's book The Outlying Fells of Lakeland. He mentions "the feature of most interest being a remarkable profusion of ancient cairns."

References

 

Fells of the Lake District